Folwell is a surname. Notable people with the surname include: 

Arthur Folwell (1904–1966), Australian rugby league footballer and coach
Bob Folwell (1885–1928), American football player and coach. 
Dale Folwell (born 1958), American politician
William H. Folwell (1924-2022), American Episcopal prelate
William Watts Folwell (1833–1929), American educator, writer, and historian 
Louis Folwell Hart (1862–1929), American politician

See also
Folwell, Minneapolis, neighborhood in Minneapolis, Minnesota, United States
Gertrude C. Folwell School
Fallwell

Surnames of British Isles origin
English-language surnames